Freedom Radio  (a.k.a. A Voice in the Night) is a 1941 British propaganda film directed by Anthony Asquith and starring Clive Brook, Diana Wynyard, Raymond Huntley and Derek Farr. It is set in Nazi Germany during the Second World War and concerns an underground German resistance group who run a radio station broadcasting against the totalitarian Third Reich.

It was shot at Shepperton Studios. The film's sets were designed by the art director Paul Sheriff.

Plot
The story begins in Vienna just before the beginning of the Second World War. Dr Roder is physician to some important members of the Nazi party but prefers being at his luxurious house with his wife, Irena, and servants. Irena's brother Otto returns from Italy and they throw a party with many interesting and high-ranking attendees. During the party the Gestapo call, requiring his immediate attendance.

At his club, the main servitor, Sebastian, announces the club is closing and they will not see him again.

His wife Irena is an actress, and after her performance it is related that Adolf Hitler very much admired her performance. She is offered a post in Berlin as Reich Director of Popular Pageantry.
At church the priest decries the deposition of a fellow priest, inciting an attack by a group of SS officers including Otto who glares at the shocked doctor. The priest is killed but the press release blames the congregation.

Hans Glaser is trying to get a radio sales licence and the doctor says he will try to help. He tells his fiancee Elly who runs a newspaper stall, despite various papers regularly being confiscated.

Frau Schmidt is pestered by her neighbour who wants to borrow lard. The neighbour eavesdrops and hears her listening to French broadcasts. The neighbour reports her to the SS who smash her radio and arrest her just as the granddaughter Elly arrives. An SS officer assaults the girl. After interrogation she is sent to a "rest home".

Dr Roder and his wife start drifting apart especially when he says the Nazi party is like a cancer. She leaves him and goes to stay in Stuttgart. Things get worse, with beatings, interrogations and book burning.

The doctor asks Hans to build a secret radio. Hans first suspects a trick. The doctor explains he wants to create a "Freedom Station"... both knowing they face death if caught. They use a basement under a toy shop and smuggle parts in through toys brought for repair.

He creates a secret radio station transmitting on 26.9, from which  he broadcasts condemnations of Hitler and prays for a "better" Germany to arise from the ashes of his ruined country. The unauthorised broadcast is intercepted and a public announcement made saying "do not listen to 26.9" accidentally promoting the station. They broadcast each evening at 10.30pm.

The birth of "Freedom Radio" sees the creation of an underground group of anti-Nazis who regard Karl as their leader.

Multiple people ring the doctor to wish him happy birthday... but it is not his birthday.

Captain Muller explains to his superiors how triangulation can be used to calculate where the signal is coming from. He blames Goebels for jamming the signal which then cannot be traced.

Otto visits Irena when the radio is on, they both think they recognise Dr Roder's voice. Otto is asked to join Muller's detection unit. Fenner starts doing more of the live broadcasts and the doctor's voice is put onto a gramophone record for broadcast.

His friend Rudolf has friends on each side. It is intimated to Rudolph in a coded message that Germany will invade Poland on the following Friday.

It is discovered that Hitler will be making a major broadcast from a stadium and Hans goes to rig up a bypass to allow their own message to be broadcast instead.
Ironically Irena is in charge of organising the pageantry of the huge rally. She has a special seat with Rabenau. Hitler starts to speak then it jumps to Roder... he speaks for under a minute before the power is switched off. Hans escapes dressed as an SS officer.

They suspect Dr Roder and burst into his clinic. They find nothing. Meanwhile Hans gets home and finds Elly in his room.. she looks broken, like an old woman. She has been in a concentration camp.

His wife returns and accuses him of being a traitor. He vows to make one last broadcast. Otto appears and chats with Mrs Roder; he overheard them talking and believes she knows where her husband is going to make the broadcast from. She is taken to Ranenau's office, but tells them the wrong place. However, they work out that Dr Roder had indicated a photo in a frame as the site of the broadcast. The SS identify it as Spiedler's cottage. As Ranenau tells Irena that there will indeed be war she goes to Dr Roder to warn him that the Gestapo are coming to the cottage. But the doctor sets up the transmitter in the back of a van. Irena joins him. The Gestapo close in and locate the van. They fire a machine gun into the van killing the doctor but not before he broadcasts their plan to invade Poland. As he is killed, first Irena takes over the broadcast, then, when she is killed, others in the group broadcast that good people were murdered that day, but that they will continue to broadcast the truth.

Cast
 Clive Brook as Dr. Karl Roder 
 Diana Wynyard as Irena Roder 
 Raymond Huntley as Rabenau 
 Derek Farr as Hans Glaser 
 Joyce Howard as Elly Schmidt
 Howard Marion-Crawford as Kummer
 John Penrose as Otto 
 Morland Graham as Father Landbach 
 Ronald Squire as Rudolf Spiedler 
 Reginald Beckwith as Fenner 
 Clifford Evans as Dressler 
 Bernard Miles as Captain Müller S
 Gibb McLaughlin as Dr Weiner
 Muriel George as Hanna
 Martita Hunt as Frau Lehmann - Concierge
 Hay Petrie as Sebastian
 Manning Whiley as SS Trooper
 Katie Johnson as Granny Schmidt
 George Hayes as Policeman
 Everley Gregg as Maria Tattenheim
 Marie Ault as Old Woman Customer
 Abraham Sofaer as Heini
 Joan Hickson as Katie
 Pat McGrath as Kurt
 Wyndham Milligan as SS Guard
 Bunty Payne as Ema
 William Hartnell as Radio Operator

Critical reception
The New York Times critic wrote that "this is a frankly propagandistic drama...The admirable emotional restraint which went into the making of several of the better British war films seen here in the past year is sadly lacking."

Sky Movies called the film, "gripping, strongly cast and more subtle than most propaganda thrillers of its time...And film buffs may spot Katie Johnson, later to win fame in The Ladykillers but here, 13 years earlier, already in granny roles!"

Wolfgang Gans zu Putlitz, German diplomat operating for British intelligence, recalls in his autobiography working on the film as a consultant at Shepperton in the winter of 1939–40.

External links

 Freedom Calling! The Story Of The Secret German Radio
 German Peoples Radio - Wikipedia

References

1941 films
British World War II propaganda films
Two Cities Films films
Films directed by Anthony Asquith
Films with screenplays by Anatole de Grunwald
Columbia Pictures films
Films shot at Shepperton Studios
Films set in Berlin
British war drama films
1941 war films
1941 drama films
1940s English-language films